Martina Navratilova and Lisa Raymond were the defending champions from 2003, but Navratilova chose not to participate. Raymond successfully defended her title, playing alongside Alicia Molik.

Seeds
The top four seeds receive a bye into the second round.

Results

Draw

References

2004 Women's Singles
Advanta Championships - Singles
Sports in Philadelphia
Tennis in Pennsylvania